My Favorite Things is the first studio album by Shiori Takei, released on September 15, 2004 under Giza Studio label. The album consists of two previous released singles such as Shizukanaru Melody and Kimi ni Koishiteru. The album charted at #78 on the Oricon charts in its first week. It charted for 2 weeks and sold 4,237 copies.

Track listing

Personnel
Credits adapted from the CD booklet of My Favorite Things.

Shiori Takei – vocals, songwriting
Nana Azuki (Garnet Crow) - songwriting
Aika Ohno - composing
Kenta Takamori - composing
Koji Goto - composing
Hiya & Katsuma - composing
Hitoshi Okamoto (Garnet Crow) - composing
Akihito Tokunaga (doa) - composing
Satoru Kobayashi - arranging
Hirohito Furui (Garnet Crow) - arranging
Hiroshi Asai (The Tambourines) - arranging
Dr.Terachi & Pierrot Le Fou - arranging
Takahashi Masuzaki (Dimension) - guitar, bass, arranging
Ohga Yoshinobu (OOM) - guitar

Koga Kazunori - guitar
Itsufumu Ohgawa - guitar
Akira Onozuka (Dimension) - piano
Osamu Ueishi - trumpet, flugel horn
Juan Carlos López Valdés - percussions
Shinji Takashima - directing, male vox
Aki Morimoto - recording engineer
Katsuyuki Yoshimatsu - recording engineer
Shin Takauwa - recording engineer
Takayuki Ichikawa - recording engineer
Hiroyuki Kubota - recording engineer
Akio Nakajima - mix engineer
Masahiro Shimada - mastering engineer
Gan Kojima – art direction
Kanonji - producing

In media
Shizukanaru Melody: the song was used in Yomiuri Telecasting Corporation TV program "Pro Doumyaku" as ending theme

References 

2004 debut albums
Shiori Takei albums
Being Inc. albums
Giza Studio albums
Japanese-language albums